Navassa Island Light is a deactivated lighthouse on Navassa Island, which lies in the Caribbean Sea at the south end of the Windward Passage between the islands of Hispaniola (Haiti and the Dominican Republic) to the east and Cuba and Jamaica to the west. It is on the shortest route between the east coast of the United States and the Panama Canal. The light was built in 1917 and deactivated in 1996. The light is gradually deteriorating from lack of maintenance.  The keepers' house is roofless and in ruins.

The importance of the light before the advent of GPS is evident in the fact that it has the twelfth-highest tower and fourth-highest focal plane of all U.S. lights.

See also

List of lighthouses in the United States

References

Lighthouses completed in 1917
Houses completed in 1917
Navassa Island
Lighthouses in insular areas of the United States
1917 establishments in the United States